St. Andrew's Church, Caunton is a parish church in the Church of England in Caunton, Nottinghamshire.

The church is Grade I listed by the Department for Digital, Culture, Media and Sport as a building of outstanding architectural or historic interest.

History

The church was medieval but restored in 1869 by Ewan Christian.

List of vicars

William de Holm 1306
Thomas 1318
William Hull 1470
John Barker
John Hardy
James Lee (Leghe) 1535
William Olyver
William Smythe 1541-1555
James Lee 1555
Richard Stanshall/Stanshare 1555-1557
Roger Jackeson 1557-1561
Robert Fraser 1561-1567
Hugh Hole 1567-1579
Matthew Boyle 1579-1591
John Smvidy 1610-1617
Richard Hewes 1617-1638
Thomas Infield 1641-1649
Francis Burton 1649
Edward Overend 1661-1664
Thomas Salter 1664–1699
George Benlowes 1708-1731
Thomas Leach 1731-1755
William Harding 1755-1778
James Burnell 1778-1817
Joseph Lister 1817-1838
Charles Fletcher 1838-1850
Samuel Hole 1850-1887
Henry Bryan McConnager Holden 1888-1891
John Tinkler 1891-1924
Arthur Alcock Baillie 1924-1925
Thomas Stanley Lupton 1925-1935
James Spencer Granville Barley 1935-1949
Richard George Hall 1949-1954
Eric William Trueman Dicken 1954-1965
Wilfred Lawson Archer 1965-1973
Robert Purdon Neill 1973-1976
William Harvey Snow 1976-1979
Charles Kemp Buck 1979-1982
Vacancy 1982-1990
Robert Andrew Whittaker 1990-1996
Anthony I Tucker 1996-2006
Sheila Dixon 2005-

Pipe Organ
The church has a small two manual pipe organ. A specification of the organ can be found on the National Pipe Organ Register

Current parish status
It is in a group of parishes which includes:
St. Andrew's Church, Caunton
St. Giles' Church, Cromwell
Holy Rood Church, Ossington
St. Laurence's Church, Norwell

Sources

Caunton
Caunton